In Inuit mythology, Alignak is a lunar deity and god of weather, water, tides, eclipses, and earthquakes.

See also
 List of lunar deities

References

Inuit gods
Lunar gods
Sky and weather gods
Sea and river gods
Earth gods